The Incredible Mr Tanner was a short-lived British television sitcom which aired on ITV in 1981. It was scripted by the writing team of Brian Cooke and Johnnie Mortimer, a remake of their earlier series Kindly Leave the Kerb about  second-rate escapologist Ernest Tanner with Brian Murphy replacing Peter Butterworth in the role.

Actors who appeared in episodes of the series include Patsy Rowlands, Talfryn Thomas, John Forgeham, Bryan Coleman, Willoughby Goddard, Jesse Birdsall, Lionel Murton and Ray Barron.

Main cast
 Brian Murphy as  Ernest Tanner
 Roy Kinnear as  Sidney Pratt
 Tony Melody as Archie
 Rosie Collins as  Prudence
 Joseph O'Conor as  Peregrine

References

Bibliography
 Horace Newcomb. Encyclopedia of Television. Routledge, 2014.

External links
 

1981 British television series debuts
1981 British television series endings
1980s British comedy television series
ITV sitcoms
Television shows produced by Thames Television
Television series by Fremantle (company)
English-language television shows